The 2018 VAFA season was the 118th season of the Victorian Amateur Football Association (VAFA), and the 81st under its current name since 1933. Seventy teams participated across seven divisions under a promotion and relegation system.

Ladders

Premier

Premier B

Premier C

Division 1

Division 2

Eltham Collegians transferred to the Northern Football League after the conclusion of the season.

Division 3

Division 4

 Mt. Lilydale Old Collegians merged with veteran side Croydon North to form Croydon North-MLOC Football Club after the conclusion of the season. The new team then transferred to the Eastern Football League.

References

VAFA
Australian rules football competition seasons
Victorian Amateur Football Association seasons